Pool 2 of the 1987 Rugby World Cup began on 24 May and was completed on 3 June. The pool was composed of Wales, Ireland, Canada and Tonga.

Standings

Canada vs Tonga

Ireland vs Wales

Tonga vs Wales

Canada vs Ireland

Canada vs Wales

Ireland vs Tonga

References

External links
 1987 Rugby World Cup results at World Rugby
 Full Results and Statistics at ESPN

Pool 2
1987 in Canadian rugby union
1987 in Tongan sport
1987–88 in Welsh rugby union
1987–88 in Irish rugby union